Lasiocephalus is a genus of South American flowering plants in groundsel tribe within the sunflower family. The genus was shown to be part of Senecio and predominantly occurs in tropical alpine-like regions.

 Species
 Lasiocephalus doryphyllus (Cuatrec.) Cuatrec. - Venezuela, Colombia
 Lasiocephalus gargantanus (Cuatrec.) Cuatrec. - Colombia
 Lasiocephalus lingulatus Schltdl. - Ecuador
 Lasiocephalus loeseneri (Hieron.) Cuatrec. - Peru
 Lasiocephalus longipenicillatus (Sch.Bip. ex Sandwith) Cuatrec. - Venezuela
 Lasiocephalus ovatus Schltdl. - Colombia, Ecuador
 Lasiocephalus pichinchensis Cuatrec. - Ecuador
 Lasiocephalus puracensis (Cuatrec.) Cuatrec. - Colombia
 Lasiocephalus sodiroi (Hieron.) Cuatrec. - Ecuador
 Lasiocephalus yacuanquensis (Cuatrec.) Cuatrec. - Colombia

References

Senecioneae
Asteraceae genera
Flora of South America